Cerato may refer to:
Kia Cerato, a compact car produced by the South Korean automaker Kia Motors
Ceratostigma, is a genus of eight species of flowering plants in the family Plumbaginaceae